The Vietnam, Cambodia, and Laos Veterans Memorial is installed outside the Utah State Capitol in Salt Lake City, in the U.S. state of Utah. Dedicated on October 14, 1989, the memorial features a bronze statue of a soldier by Clyde Ross Morgan and a circular wall by Mark Davenport.

References

External links

 

1989 establishments in Utah
1989 sculptures
Military monuments and memorials in the United States
Monuments and memorials in Utah
Outdoor sculptures in Salt Lake City
Sculptures of men in the United States
Statues in Utah
Utah State Capitol